The 1925 NCAA baseball season, play of college baseball in the United States organized by the National Collegiate Athletic Association (NCAA) began in the spring of 1925.  Play largely consisted of regional matchups, some organized by conferences, and ended in June.  No national championship event was held until 1947.

Conference Changes
The Pacific Coast Conference returned to its two division format after one season in a single conference, with the California schools (California, Southern California, Stanford) making up the Southern and the remaining five schools (Idaho, Oregon, Oregon State, Washington, Washington State) forming the Northern.

Conference winners
This is a partial list of conference champions from the 1924 season.

References